A bread roll is a small, often round loaf of bread served as a meal accompaniment (eaten plain or with butter). A roll can be served and eaten whole or cut transversely and dressed with filling between the two halves. Rolls are also commonly used to make sandwiches similar to those produced using slices of bread.

Bread rolls

There are many names for bread rolls, especially in local dialects of British English. The different terms originated from bakers, who labelled different bread rolls depending on how they made the dough and how they were cooked. Over time, most people have come to use one name to refer to all similar products regardless of whether or not it is technically correct by the old terms.

 Asado roll – Filipino bread roll with savory-sweet pork asado filling
 Bap – larger soft roll, roughly 5–6 inches (12–15 cm) in diameter. May contain fats such as lard or butter to provide tenderness. Can come in multiple shapes dependent on region. Baps as traditionally made in Scotland are not sweet, unlike the Irish version, which may contain currants. The 9th Edition of the Concise Oxford Dictionary (1995) says that the word "bap" dates from the 16th century and that its origin is unknown.
 Batch (generally the same as a bap) –  term used in North Warwickshire, Nuneaton, Coventry and Cheshire as well as on the Wirral, England
 Barm or barm cake or flour cake – flat, often floured, savoury, small bread made using a natural leaven including mashed hops to stop it souring; a term often used in Liverpool, Manchester, South Lancashire and West Lancashire.
 Belfast bap – white bread roll with a dark top.
 Blaa – doughy, white bread roll. A speciality found in Waterford, Ireland.
 Breadcake – term used in Yorkshire and Annesley in North Nottinghamshire
 Breakfast roll – (chiefly Irish) a bread roll usually filled with elements of a traditional fry (fried Irish breakfast foods).
 Bublik
 Bulkie roll – type of roll with a crust that is usually slightly crisp or crunchy and has no toppings.
 Bun – term for a bread roll, bread batch, or bread barm cake, primarily used in Northern England and in much of Canada.
 Butterflake roll – a New England originated roll made of several layers of dough oriented vertically and separated by thin butter layers. When cooked in a muffin cup the layers fan out at the top. Also called a Fan Tan roll or Yankee Buttermilk roll.
 Cemita
Challah Roll  – Jewish Challah bread dough formed into a roll, often in a knotted or swirled form. It is found in most Kosher sections of grocery stores, and therefore is commonly eaten by Jewish families across the United States. 
 Cloverleaf roll – American version, consisting of three small balls of dough in a muffin cup, proofed and baked together.
 Cob – round roll, can be crusty or not; a term often used in the English Midlands
 Concha – Mexican pastry that is famous for its shell-like shape
 Dinner roll – smaller roll, often crusty
 Finger roll – soft roll about three times longer than it is wide
 French roll – generic term for the bread roll. Also a sweeter, softer roll with milk added to the dough.
 Fritter is a stuffed bread roll. 
 Hoagie roll – used to prepare hoagie sandwiches
 Houska
 Huffkin – kentish roll with a dimple in the middle
 Italian roll or hoagie roll, long roll or steak roll – long, narrow roll with an airy, dry interior and crusty exterior.
 Kaiser roll – crusty round roll, often topped with poppy seeds or sesame seeds, made by folding corners of a square inward so that their points meet.
 Kummelweck – kaiser roll or bulkie roll that is topped with a mixture of kosher salt and caraway seeds. This type of roll is a regional variation found primarily in parts of Germany and in Upstate New York.
 Llonguet – oblong bread roll with a groove in the top originating in the Catalan countries
 Manchet – yeast roll popular with the Tudor Court of which there are many variations.
 Morning roll
 Nudger – long soft white or brown roll similar to a large finger roll common in Liverpool.
 Onion roll – roll flavoured or topped with onions, sometimes with poppy seeds.
 Oven bottom – flat, floury, soft roll; a term often used in Lancashire
 Pampushka – a small savory or sweet yeast-raised bun or doughnut typical for Ukrainian cuisine
 Pandesal – a Filipino staple bread roll
 Pan de coco – Filipino sweet roll with sweetened shredded coconut fillings (bukayo)
 Pan de monja – a dense bread roll from the Philippines with a characteristic indentation down the middle.
 Pan de siosa – Filipino soft pull-apart bread
 Pastel de Camiguín – Filipino soft bread with a custard filling
 Parker House roll – roll made by flattening the center of a ball of dough with a rolling pin so that it becomes an oval shape and then folding the oval in half. They are made with milk and are generally quite buttery, soft, and slightly sweet with a crispy shell.
 Pav – soft Indian bread roll/dinner roll
 Pinagong
 Pistolet
 Putok – also called "star bread"
 Röggelchen – A small pastry in the form of a double roll made from two pieces of dough.
 Roll or bread roll
 Sally Lunn bun – Speciality of Bath, England. Brioche-like soft large sweet bun commonly served warmed and buttered.
 Scuffler – roughly triangular bread roll traditionally baked in Yorkshire.
 Speķrauši
 Spuccadella
 Stottie cake – thick, flat, round loaf. Stotties are common in North East England.
 Sweet roll, also called a breakfast roll (chiefly US) – can refer to a variety of sweet, yeast-leavened breakfast breads or dessert foods.
 Tahini roll
 Teacake
 Zeeuwse bolus – spiral-shaped bun covered in dark brown sugar, lemon zest and cinnamon

See also

 Breakfast roll
 Croissant (crescent roll)
 List of baked goods
 List of breads
 List of bread dishes
 List of buns
 Ovelgönne bread roll
 Sweet roll

References

Breads
Rolls